King Gary is a British television comedy series made for the BBC co-created and written by Tom Davis and James De Frond. Davis also stars as the eponymous lead character, Gary King, while De Frond directs.

The pilot episode was shown on BBC One in the UK in December 2018. The show was commissioned for a full series which was aired in January 2020, with a Christmas special shown on 23 December 2020 on BBC One. A second series was commissioned in February 2020. The BBC have revealed there are no plans for another series.

Plot
Set amongst a competitive working class crescent in the outer London suburbs, Gary King is a family man who has taken over his dad’s building firm.

Cast
 Tom Davis as Gary King
Laura Checkley as Terri King
Simon Day as Big Gary
Camille Coduri as Denise King
Romesh Ranganathan as Stuart Williams
Miranda Hennessy as Chloe Ferdinando
Neil Maskell as Winkle
Riley Burgin as Teddy King 
Osi Okerafor as Darren Ferdinando

Episodes

Pilot (2018)

Series 1 (2020)

Christmas Special (2020)

Series 2 (2021)

Production
Davis and De Frond had known each other from school and previously worked together on Murder in Successville. They tried to ensure all cast members were personally familiar with the suburban area on the outer London boroughs where the series is set.

Reception
Shane Allen, director of BBC Comedy said “With King Gary we also get a big daft southern comedy voice in Tom Davis at the centre of a very exciting cast.” The Daily Telegraph praised how “Davis and James De Frond have written about the working class world they know...Everything from the decor to the language feels right. They throw in a few good lines, too” but overall felt it compares less well with previous BBC sitcoms such as Gavin and Stacey that covered some of the same cultural ground. The Independent praised “a decent supply of zingers” in the script. The Times suspected the viewer would “either love or hate King Gary. It offers unsubtle Essex geezerish humour and barbecue was pronounced “BBQ” to an irritating degree. But I am quite unsubtle and have a puerile sense of humour and it made me smile, especially when I saw that Romesh Ranganathan was in it...
Yes, it’s a bit crude and one-note and could wear thin after 30 minutes, but it was cheerful nonsense and we need more of that.”

References

External links 
 
 
 
 

2018 British television series debuts
2021 British television series endings
2010s British sitcoms
2020s British sitcoms
Television series by Banijay
Television shows set in London
BBC television sitcoms
English-language television shows